Colonel Haviland Le Mesurier (6 February 1856 – 25 November 1913) was an Australian soldier.

Born in Fremantle, Western Australia on 6 February 1856, he attended schooling at the Bedford Grammar School, England, and also in Europe. He arrived in New South Wales, Australia in 1884, and obtained commission in the Royal Artillery in 1886. He was posted to the New South Wales Artillery and was the acting adjutant of the 1st Garrison Division between December 1890 and September 1891 and acting staff officer between October 1891 until June 1893. Promoted to Captain in 1893, he passed the gunnery course at Woolwich and Shoeburyness in 1894, for which he received a first-class certificate with honours. He was the second in command of the New South Wales Imperial Bushmen during the Second Boer War until he was appointed to command the 8th Australian Commonwealth Light Horse. He took part in operations in Rhodesia, Transvaal, west of Pretoria, Transvaal Orange River Colony and Cape Colony. While the commandant of military forces in South Australia, he died on 25 November 1913.

References

1856 births
1913 deaths
Australian Army officers
Australian military personnel of the Second Boer War
People from Fremantle